Deraeocorini is a tribe of plant bugs in the family Miridae. There are at least 19 genera and more than 340 described species in Deraeocorini.

Genera
These 19 genera belong to the tribe Deraeocorini:

 Acutifromiris Hernandez & Stonedahl, 1999
 Agastictus Bergroth, 1922
 Alloeotomus Fieber, 1858
 Apoderaeocoris Nakatani, Yasunaga et Takai, 2007
 Cimicicapsus Poppius, 1915
 Cimidaeorus Hsiao & Ren, 1983
 Deraeocapsus Knight, 1921
 Deraeocoris Kirschbaum, 1856
 Diplozona Van Duzee, 1915
 Eurybrochis Kirkaldy, 1902
 Eurychilopterella Reuter, 1909
 Eustictus Reuter, 1909
 Fingulus Distant, 1904
 Kalamemiris Hosseini & Cassis, 2017
 Klopicoris Van Duzee, 1915
 Platycapsus Reuter, 1904
 Pseudocamptobrochis Poppius, 1911
 Strobilocapsus Bliven, 1956
 Termatomiris Ghauri, 1975

References

Further reading

 

 
Hemiptera tribes
Deraeocorinae